Beulah is a town in Mercer County, North Dakota, United States. The population was 3,058 at the 2020 census. Beulah is home to the Dakota Gasification Company.  It is near the largest lignite mine in the United States, owned by North American Coal Corporation.

History
Beulah was founded in 1914. It was named after Beulah Stinchcombe, the niece of a local land developer.

Geography and climate

Beulah is located at  (47.268088, −101.777229).

Demographics

2010 census
As of the census of 2010, there were 3,121 people, 1,353 households, and 862 families living in the town. The racial makeup of the town was 94.8% White, 0.2% African American, 2.3% Native American, 0.3% Asian, 0.3% Pacific Islander, 0.7% from other races, and 1.4% from two or more races. Hispanic or Latino of any race were 2.3% of the population.

There were 1,353 households, of which 26.8% had children under the age of 18 living with them, 55.1% were married couples living together, 4.7% had a female householder with no husband present, 3.9% had a male householder with no wife present, and 36.3% were non-families. 31.9% of all households were made up of individuals, and 12.1% had someone living alone who was 65 years of age or older. The average household size was 2.24 and the average family size was 2.81.

The median age in the town was 44.2 years. 22.3% of residents were under the age of 18; 6.4% were between the ages of 18 and 24; 22.1% were from 25 to 44; 34.3% were from 45 to 64; and 14.9% were 65 years of age or older. The gender makeup of the town was 51.3% male and 48.7% female.

2000 census
As of the census of 2000, there were 3,152 people, 1,213 households, and 851 families living in the town. The population density was 1,307.8 inhabitants per square mile (505.0/km). There were 1,475 housing units at an average density of 612.0 per square mile (236.3/km). The racial makeup of the town was 95.78% White, 0.03% African American, 1.68% Native American, 0.29% Asian, 0.63% Pacific Islander, 0.16% from other races, and 1.43% from two or more races. Hispanic or Latino of any race were 0.48% of the population.

The top 6 ancestry groups in the town are German (74.3%), Norwegian (12.3%), Irish (9.3%), Russian (7.7%), English (3.4%), Czech (2.3%).

There were 1,213 households, of which 39.9% had children under the age of 18 living with them, 61.0% were married couples living together, 6.8% had a female householder with no husband present, and 29.8% were non-families. 27.8% of all households were made up of individuals, and 12.9% had someone living alone who was 65 years of age or older. The average household size was 2.53 and the average family size was 3.09.

The median household income was $45,256 and the  median family income was $54,700. Males had a median income of $50,870 versus $20,792 for females. The per capita income for the town was $18,614. About 5.3% of families and 7.8% of the population were below the poverty line, including 4.6% of those under age 18 and 30.0% of those age 65 or over.

Education
Beulah's educational system started with a one-room school house, located in an unused barn south of town. At its advent, only five local children attended the school.  As its reputation grew, children from surrounding communities increased the school's attendance to over one hundred students. The school went on to receive several awards for educational excellence and was considered the pride of the town until a fire in 1934 destroyed the building. Previously, an additional Beulah School was built in 1920.

Beulah has an elementary, middle, and high school. The sports teams are called the Miners. The American Legion baseball team is called the Cyclones.

References

External links
 

Cities in North Dakota
Cities in Mercer County, North Dakota
Populated places established in 1914
1914 establishments in North Dakota